The Czechoslovak Social Democratic Youth was a youth organization in Czechoslovakia. The organization was the youth wing of the Czechoslovak Social Democratic Workers Party.
First organization dissolved in 1921, when it transformed into Young Communist League of Czechoslovakia.

Second organization founded in 1921 dissolved in 1936, when it existed inside Czechoslovak Youth Committee. It was also known as Movement of Democratic Youth.

In 1945–1948 Social Democratic Youth branch existed as part of Union of Czech Youth.

References

Youth wings of political parties in Czechoslovakia
Youth wings of social democratic parties
Czech Social Democratic Party